Blood Speaks is the third studio album by English folk duo Smoke Fairies. It was released in March 2012 under V2 Records.

Track list

Personnel
All personnel credits adapted from Blood Speakss album notes.

 Art Direction – StudioThomson
 Viola, Banjo, Omnichord – Neil Walsh 
 Bass – Kristofer Harris
 Drums, Timpani – Robert Wilks
 Vocals, Guitar – Jessica Davies
 Vocals, Guitar, Organ, Piano – Katherine Blamire
 Producer, Recorded By, Mixed By – Head
 Written-By – Smoke Fairies

References

2012 albums
Smoke Fairies albums
V2 Records albums